Donald Cowan (born 17 August 1931) is an English former footballer who played in the Football League as a goalkeeper for Darlington.

Cowan was born in Sherburn, County Durham. He began his football career with local club Bowburn, and was on the books of Middlesbrough as an apprentice. After completing his National Service in the Royal Air Force, he turned professional with Darlington, with whom he made 17 league appearances over two seasons. He then played non-league football with North Shields.

He went on to be an administrator in local football in the County Durham area for many years, and was a vice-president of the Durham County Football Association.

References

1931 births
Living people
Footballers from County Durham
English footballers
Association football goalkeepers
Darlington F.C. players
North Shields F.C. players
English Football League players